Ársæll Kristjánsson (born 5 October 1958) is an Icelandic former footballer who played as a defender. He won two caps for the Iceland national football team; his first international appearance came in the 2–1 win against Saudi Arabia on 25 September 1984. Kristjánsson played his second and final match for Iceland in the 1–0 victory over the Faroe Islands on 12 July 1985.

References
 

1958 births
Living people
Arsaell Kristjansson
Association football defenders
Arsaell Kristjansson
Arsaell Kristjansson
Arsaell Kristjansson